Egvad may refer to:

 Egvad Municipality
 Egvad Parish